The 1954 Humboldt State Lumberjacks football team represented Humboldt State College during the 1954 college football season. Humboldt State competed in the Far Western Conference (FWC).

The 1954 Lumberjacks were led by fourth-year head coach Phil Sarboe. They played home games at the Redwood Bowl in Arcata, California. Humboldt State finished with a record of five wins and five losses (5–5, 3–2 FWC). The Lumberjacks outscored their opponents 174–116 for the season.

Schedule

Notes

References

Humboldt State
Humboldt State Lumberjacks football seasons
Humboldt State Lumberjacks football